Steve Beaton (born 5 April 1964) is an English professional darts player who plays in Professional Darts Corporation (PDC) events. He won the BDO World Darts Championship in 1996 and is a former World No. 1.

Background
Beaton was born in Coventry, Warwickshire, England.

BDO career

Beaton made his World Championship debut in 1992, at a time when the world darts championship was still a unified tournament. He lost in the first round to Chris Johns 1–3, but he was encouraged by his performance in the same tournament in 1993 when he achieved a huge upset win over the tournament favourite and former world champion Dennis Priestley, and he also beat another former world champion in Bob Anderson, before losing in the semi-final to Alan Warriner. He became a full-time professional later in 1993 at a time after the split, which saw the WDC players banned from all BDO tournaments – and Beaton went on to win the prestigious Winmau World Masters, beating Les Wallace in the final.

After the WDC (now PDC) players were expelled from all BDO tournaments in April 1993, it left Beaton as the top seeded player for the 1994 and 1995 BDO world championships, but he lost in the first round both times, to Nick Gedney and Dave Askew respectively, both times losing 2–3 after leading 2–0. But in 1996, he finally delivered at the BDO world championships, beating Co Stompé, John Part, Martin Adams, Andy Fordham and then Richie Burnett in the final to clinch the BDO World Championship.

When he came back to defend his world title in 1997, Beaton was within the width of the double 10 wire of reaching the final. During his tight semi-final match against Marshall James, which went all the way to a sudden death eleventh leg in the ninth and deciding set, Beaton narrowly missed a 140 checkout for the match by putting his one match dart right on the wire of the double 10, hitting the single 10. James then responded with a 106 checkout (single 20, treble 18, double 16) to win the match and end Beaton's title defence.

Beaton won many Open titles during his career in BDO tournaments including the Dutch, Danish, Belgian and Swedish Opens.

Beaton continued to play in the BDO version of the World Championship until 2001 (reaching the semi-final in 1997 and quarter-final in 1998), while also participating in some televised PDC events. When the PDC changed the eligibility rules for their televised tournaments from the start of 2002, Beaton decided to switch to playing in the PDC World Darts Championship.

PDC career

Beaton has never made the same impact in the PDC, having failed to reach the quarter-finals in any of his attempts at the world crown, his best finishes being three Round of 16 losses in 2002, 2004 and 2020. In 2002, when the tournament was still only five rounds, he got knocked out in round two by John Part 0–6. In 2004 when he got a bye to the third round and was knocked out in round four by Mark Dudbridge 1–4. His poor form has seen him slip down the world rankings at times, but he has nearly always maintained a position in the top 32, apart from some periods in 2007 and 2008 when his ranking occasionally went down to around number 40. Just when he looked in danger of falling away in the rankings at that time, a big improvement in his form in 2009 and 2010 saw Beaton's ranking back into the top 32, where he has been in the decade since. Beaton has reached the semi-finals in four major PDC tournaments – the 2001 World Matchplay when he lost to Richie Burnett, the 2004 UK Open when he lost to Roland Scholten, the 2004 World Grand Prix when he lost to Alan Warriner, and the 2010 Grand Slam of Darts when he lost to Scott Waites. Prior to losing to Waites at the 2010 Grand Slam of Darts, Beaton had rolled back the years in his quarter final match by coming from 11 to 14 behind to win five legs in a row and defeat the three-time defending champion Phil Taylor 16–14, in one of finest match wins of Beaton's career.

Beaton saw a rise in form in the 2009 season, taking him even further up the  rankings to 19th in the world. Beaton won his first title in almost nine years when he took the Players Championship in Nuland in October. He also finished runner up in the European championship beating Adrian Lewis, Mark Walsh and James Wade en route to the final where he was defeated 11–3 by Phil Taylor. This result however gave Beaton a place in the 2009 Grand Slam of Darts, where he progressed from the round robin stage courtesy of wins over Co Stompé and Kevin McDine before being comprehensively outplayed by Simon Whitlock.

At the 2010 Grand Slam of Darts, Beaton produced a major upset by beating three-time defending champion Phil Taylor 16–14 in the quarter-finals, having trailed 9–13 and 11–14. Earlier in the week, Beaton had needed to defeat Paul Nicholson 5–3 or better at the round robin stage to stay in the tournament (he won 5–1), and followed that up with a 10–6 win over Ted Hankey who had himself defeated Taylor in his group. Beaton was defeated by eventual champion Scott Waites 16–9 in the semi-final. Despite his good form in 2010 he was narrowly defeated in the first round of the 2011 PDC World Darts Championship by Mark Hylton eventually losing by 3 sets to 2. The following year, Beaton recovered from two sets and three match darts down against Magnus Caris to win 3–2, but was beaten by Simon Whitlock 1–4 in the second round.

In the rest of the major events in 2012, Beaton could not win more than one game in any of them with his best results being last 16 exits in the World Matchplay, World Grand Prix and Players Championship Finals. On the PDC Pro Tour he lost in the semi-finals of the second Players Championship in a deciding leg to Dave Chisnall and also reached two other quarter-finals.

At the 2013 World Championship, Beaton defeated qualifier Kyle Anderson 3–0, but was then beaten 4–2 by James Wade. After the tournament, he was ranked world number 28. He reached the quarter-finals of a PDC Pro Tour event for the first time in six months in April at the seventh UK Open Qualifier, but lost 6–3 to John Part. At the UK Open itself, he lost 9–5 to Joey Palfreyman in the third round. He lost in two consecutive semi-finals in European Tour events during the year. The first of these came at the Austrian Darts Open where he missed four match darts at double 16 against Mervyn King to be edged out 6–5. The other was at the German Darts Championship where he suffered a 6–4 defeat against Dave Chisnall. He then won the German Darts Masters as he dropped only four legs in his first four games before averaging 100 in a 6–3 victory over Simon Whitlock in the semi-finals. He played Mervyn King in the final and with Beaton leading 4–3, King incredibly burst his score when on 134 by hitting a treble 20 with his final dart instead of a single to leave 40. Beaton stepped in to hit a 160 finish and, though the match went to a deciding leg, he was first to a finish to close the match out 6–5 and seal his first title for almost four years. At the World Grand Prix he missed one dart for the match in the first round against James Wade to be narrowly beaten by two sets to one. Another semi-final followed at the 12th Players Championship by seeing off Gary Anderson in the quarters before losing 6–2 to Kim Huybrechts. His surge in form during the latter half of the year saw him finish eighth on the ProTour Order of Merit to qualify for the Players Championship Finals, where he came back from 3–1 and 5–3 down against Wade in the first round to win 6–5. However, he averaged 81.41 in his next match against Wes Newton (almost 20 points lower than against Wade) and was beaten 9–3.

In the first round of the 2014 World Championship, Beaton missed four darts to move 2–0 up against Devon Petersen and was instead beaten 3–1. He lost 9–6 against Brendan Dolan in the third round of the UK Open. In June, Beaton won through to the final of the Gibraltar Darts Trophy, but he let a 4–1 lead turn into a 6–4 defeat against James Wade. He could not progress past the first round of the 2014 World Matchplay, the 2014 World Grand Prix, the 2014 European Championship or the 2014 Players Championship Finals.

In an exact reverse of their 2013 clash, Beaton was knocked out 3–0 by Kyle Anderson in the first round of the 2015 World Championship. He lost 9–5 to Peter Wright in the third round of the 2015 UK Open and the first round of both the 2015 World Matchplay (10–4 to Gary Anderson) and the 2015 World Grand Prix (2–1 in sets to Justin Pipe). Despite only winning one of his three group fixtures, Beaton qualified for the knockout stage of the Grand Slam on leg difference. He averaged almost 100 in the second round, but only had five attempts at a double as Michael van Gerwen averaged 109 in defeating Beaton 10–2.

Beaton lost 4–2 to Michael Smith in the second round of the 2016 World Championship. He played in his first final since 2014 at the sixth UK Open Qualifier and was beaten 6–2 by Van Gerwen. He also made the final of the 10th Players Championship event, but lost 6–2 to Dave Chisnall. Beaton got to the quarter-finals of the 2016 World Matchplay, which was his best performance since 2001, by defeating Jelle Klaasen 10–6 and Smith 11–7. He lost 16–13 to Gary Anderson after fighting back from 9–4 down to level the match at 12–12 before eventually succumbing to the two-time reigning world champion. After Beaton took the opening set with a 135 finish in the first round of the World Grand Prix, van Gerwen won six unanswered legs to win 2–1. He lost 6–4 to Jeffrey de Graaf in the first round of the Players Championship Finals.

Beaton failed to progress to the third round at the World Championship for the 12th year in a row when he was beaten 4–1 by James Wade in the second round of the 2017 event. In 2017, Beaton won the 13th players championship event of the year defeating Gary Anderson 6–3 in the final. In the Players Championship Finals, Beaton reached the quarter final by winning against Ronny Huybrechts, Jelle Klaasen and Jermaine Wattimena. In the quarter final, he lost 8–10 to Jonny Clayton.

In the 2018 World Championship, Beaton won 3–1 in the first round against William O'Connor but was eliminated in the second round 0–4 by Vincent van der Voort.

Nickname

Beaton is currently introduced in the PDC as The Bronzed Adonis, a nickname derived from his tanned appearance. His appearance is maintained 12 months a year via his warm weather training camps in Playa de las Américas, Tenerife. His entrance music is "Stayin' Alive" by the Bee Gees. Most recently, Beaton has taken part in a number of marathons in order to keep fit and raise money for charity, and has been referred to as The Marathon Man as a result. Beaton was once also nicknamed Magnum P.I. due to his purported likeness of the actor Tom Selleck, who played the title role in the TV series.

Personal life

Beaton currently resides in North Walsham, Norfolk, where he lives with his wife Nanette, whom he married in 1993.

He is a fan of English football club Coventry City.

World Championship record

BDO
1992: First round (lost to Chris Johns 1–3)
1993: Semi-finals (lost to Alan Warriner 2–5)
1994: First round (lost to Nick Gedney 2–3)
1995: First round (lost to Dave Askew 2–3)
1996: Winner (beat Richie Burnett 6–3)
1997: Semi-finals (lost to Marshall James 4–5)
1998: Quarter-finals (lost to Raymond van Barneveld 0–5)
1999: First round (lost to Steve Duke 0–3)
2000: Second round (lost to Andy Fordham 0–3)
2001: Second round (lost to Raymond van Barneveld 2–3)

PDC
2002: Second round (lost to John Part 0–6)
2003: Second round (lost to Dave Askew 3–4)
2004: Fourth round (lost to Mark Dudbridge 1–4)
2005: Third round (lost to Andy Hamilton 2–4)
2006: First round (lost to Jan van der Rassel 0–3)
2007: Second round (lost to Terry Jenkins 3–4)
2008: Second round (lost to James Wade 3–4)
2009: First round (lost to Alan Tabern 0–3)
2010: Second round (lost to Andy Hamilton 1–4)
2011: First round (lost to Mark Hylton 2–3)
2012: Second round (lost to Simon Whitlock 1–4)
2013: Second round (lost to James Wade 2–4)
2014: First round (lost to Devon Petersen 1–3)
2015: First round (lost to Kyle Anderson 0–3)
2016: Second round (lost to Michael Smith 2–4)
2017: Second round (lost to James Wade 1–4)
2018: Second round (lost to Vincent van der Voort 0–4)
2019: Second round (lost to Chris Dobey 0–3)
2020: Fourth round (lost to Darius Labanauskas 2–4)
2021: First round (lost to Diogo Portela 0–3)
2022: Second round (lost to Kim Huybrechts 1–3)
2023: First round (lost to Danny van Trijp 0–3)

Career statistics

(W) Won; (F) finalist; (SF) semifinalist; (QF) quarterfinalist; (#R) rounds 6, 5, 4, 3, 2, 1; (RR) round-robin stage; (Prel.) Preliminary round; (DNQ) Did not qualify; (DNP) Did not participate; (NH) Not held; (EX) Excluded; (WD) Withdrew

Performance timeline

BDO

PDC

PDC European Tour

Career finals

BDO and WDF major finals: 4 (2 wins, 2 runners-up)

PDC major finals: 1 (1 runner-up)

References

External links
 Steve Beaton official website

English darts players
BDO world darts champions
1964 births
Living people
Sportspeople from Coventry
Professional Darts Corporation current tour card holders
British Darts Organisation players
PDC ranking title winners